Richard Cock (born 1949) is a South African-born musician and conductor currently based in Johannesburg.

Early life and education
Cock was born in Port Elizabeth in 1949 and was educated at Woodridge College in the Eastern Cape, and Diocesan College and the South African College of Music in Cape Town. He was awarded a scholarship to the Royal School of Church Music in 1972.

Career

United Kingdom
He was an alto lay vicar at Chichester Cathedral before becoming Assistant Organist in 1978. As was customary for the cathedral's assistant organist, he was also Director of Music at Prebendal School, the cathedral choir school. He also established the Chichester Cathedral Choristers' Association (CCCA).

South Africa
Cock returned to South Africa in 1980. Since then he has been a producer working for the South African Broadcasting Corporation, Music Director of the National Symphony Orchestra of South Africa (1991-1999), Director of Music of St Mary's Cathedral, Johannesburg and the current Artistic Director of the Johannesburg Festival Orchestra He is also acclaimed as South Africa's 'first professional countertenor'.

See also
 Organs and organists of Chichester Cathedral

References

External links
 Official website

South African organists
Male classical organists
People from Port Elizabeth
South African College of Music alumni
Assistant Organists of Chichester Cathedral
Living people
South African radio producers
1949 births
21st-century organists
21st-century male musicians